The Leon Thomas Album is the second album by American jazz vocalist and percussionist Leon Thomas recorded in 1970 and released by the Flying Dutchman label.

Reception

AllMusic reviewer Thom Jurek stated: "On the follow-up to the mind-blowing Spirits Known and Unknown, singer, multi-instrumentalist, arranger, and composer Leon Thomas decided to take a different track. Far from the sparely orchestrated ensembles of the previous works, Thomas loaded this set with jazz luminaries  ... Side one is the up-tempo jazz ride, as Thomas and company rip through a host of his own tunes ... The real gem on the album is "Pharaoh's Tune (The Journey)," which comprises all of side two ... It's a breathtaking ride made all the more so by the long, jazzed-out setup of side one. Why this guy wasn't huge is a mystery.". Critic Robert Christgau said "He has literally expanded the musical possibilities of the human voice. He is as powerful a jazz/blues singer as Joe Williams or Joe Turner, both of whom he occasionally resembles, as inventive a scatter as Ella Fitzgerald ... I have to suspend my disbelief and recommend this record unreservedly to anyone with the slightest fondness for jazz".

Track listing
All compositions by Leon Thomas except where noted
 "Come Along" (Leon Thomas, Neal Creque) − 3:02
 "I Am" − 3:17
 "Bag's Groove" (Milt Jackson, Ellen May Shashoyan) − 3:19
 "Um, Um, Um" − 11:35
 "Pharoah's Tune (The Journey)" (Leon Thomas, Pharoah Sanders) − 17:55

Personnel
Leon Thomas − vocals, maracas, Thailand flute, Hindewe flute, Freedom flute (Ecuador), bells
Ernie Royal − trumpet (tracks 1-3 & 5)
Donald Smith (tracks 1-3 & 5), James Spaulding (tracks 4 & 5) − flute
Sonny Morgan − bongos, African oboe
Jerome Richardson − alto saxophone  (tracks 1-3 & 5)
Billy Harper − tenor saxophone  (tracks 1-3 & 5)
Howard Johnson − baritone saxophone  (tracks 1-3 & 5)
Arthur Sterling - piano
John Williams Jr. − electric bass (tracks 1-3 & 5)
Bob Cunningham − bass (tracks 4 & 5)
Billy Cobham (tracks 1-3 & 5), Roy Haynes (tracks 4 & 5) − drums
Gene Golden − bongos (tracks 4 & 5)
Richie "Pablo" Landrum − congas 
Oliver Nelson − arranger, conductor  (tracks 1-3 & 5)

References

Leon Thomas albums
1969 albums
Flying Dutchman Records albums
Albums produced by Bob Thiele
Albums arranged by Oliver Nelson
Albums conducted by Oliver Nelson